Lukáš Pešek (born 22 November 1985 in Prague, Czechoslovakia) is a Czech motorcycle racer. He competes in the Alpe Adria Road Race Superbike Championship and the Endurance FIM World Championship aboard a BMW S1000RR. He won the Alpe Adria Road Race Superbike Championship in 2016.

Having won Czech championships in 125 cc class in 2001 and 2002, when he also raced in European series, he moved to European 250 cc championship in 2003. That year he moved to World Championship mid-season, in order to replace his compatriot Jaroslav Huleš. He scored four points that year after finishing 12th in Phillip Island.

For 2004 season he moved back to 125 cc, this time at World Championship level. His season with Ajo Motorsport included many crashes. He scored a total of 20 points and was 21st in final standings.

Between 2005 and 2007, he rode Derbi bikes. His performances improved year by year. In 2005 he was 19th, in 2006 6th and in 2007 4th. He has won two Grands Prix, the races at Shanghai and Phillip Island in 2007.

For 2008 season he moved to 250s full-time, finishing his début season fifteenth.

Statistics

By season

Races by year
(key) (Races in bold indicate pole position, races in italics indicate fastest lap)

External links

1985 births
Living people
Sportspeople from Prague
125cc World Championship riders
250cc World Championship riders
Czech motorcycle racers
Moto2 World Championship riders
Supersport World Championship riders
MotoGP World Championship riders